Heathmont is a suburb of Melbourne, Victoria, Australia, 24 km east of Melbourne's Central Business District, located within the City of Maroondah local government area. Heathmont recorded a population of 9,933 at the 2021 census.

History

Heathmont was originally covered by hedge-to-hedge apple orchards. The name appears to have come from the rising land in the area having heath or low, shrub-like vegetation on it. The first shop opened in 1923 in front of a house. The population has grown from 600 people in 1953 to 8,787 people in 2001.

Heathmont Post Office opened on 15 February 1929, sometime after the railway station opened in 1926.

Heathmont was originally within the municipality of the City of Ringwood, but it became part of Maroondah City Council in December 1994.

Public transport

Heathmont railway station is located just off Canterbury Road (which runs through the heart of the suburb) and is on the Belgrave railway line. It is within ticketing Zone 2.

Ventura bus route 679, which runs from Chirnside Park to Ringwood Station via Lilydale, Mount Evelyn and along Canterbury Road, Great Ryrie St and Bedford Road, serves much of Heathmont.

Shopping

The Heathmont Shopping Centre provides services to the suburb. It includes a handful of cafes, an IGA Supermarket, two butcher shops, two bakeries, a newsagent, takeaway shops, multiple hairdressers, several massage parlours, a funeral parlour, a car wash and a post office. There is plenty of parking, and the main shopping precinct is opposite the Heathmont railway station. The distant Mount Dandenong and Dandenong Ranges are visible from much of this shopping strip.

Demographics

As of the 2006 Census, the vast majority of residents (78.6%) were born in Australia, with slightly above-average proportions also born in England, Scotland, the Netherlands and Germany. The languages spoken by slightly above-average proportions of residents were English and German. There were above-average proportions of residents of no religion (23.9%) and Uniting Church (7.3%).
The average income of Heathmont residents was above the national average (with a median family income of $1,286 per week); the suburb tends to be better off than most of its nearest neighbours. The largest two occupational groupings were professionals (23.5%, above the national average) and clerical/administrative (17.3%, also above the national average). The unemployment rate of 3.2% was below the national average of 5.2%.

Politics and representation

Heathmont contained four voting booths at the 2010 federal election, all lying within the federal electorate of Deakin. Three of those booths saw the Liberal candidate win the most primary votes, yet only two saw the Liberals win a majority of two-party preferred votes after preferences. The combined booth results across the suburb saw the primary vote split 40.1% to Labor, 41.4% to the Liberals and 12.7% to the Greens. After preferences, the split was 52.5% to Labor and 47.5% to the Liberals. The suburb tends to be highly competitive electorally and is generally a reliable barometer for the overall voting population. Heathmont and surrounding areas were visited by federal politicians Joe Hockey, Kevin Rudd, Tony Abbott and Wayne Swan throughout 2010. In 2007, Heathmont was identified as one of the 'wealthier pockets' of Deakin (along with Blackburn and Vermont) in an analysis of marginal 'leafy' suburbs in Melbourne's east, that were, by swinging to Labor, proving wrong the notion of a 'rich Lib, poor Labor' myth.

Schools

Primary schools
 Heathmont East Primary School
 Great Ryrie Primary School
 Marlborough Primary School

Secondary schools
 Heathmont College

Sport and recreation

There are many parks, such as H.E. Parker Reserve and a mini golf course. Dandenong Creek supports much wildlife, including birds and frogs, although swimming is not recommended. There is also a bike track, Dandenong Creek Trail, which runs along Dandenong Creek.

The suburb has an Australian Rules football team, the Heathmont Jets, competing in the Eastern Football League, and a lawn bowls club, Heathmont Bowls Club, that plays in the Eastern Ranges Bowls Region.

Heathmont has two tennis clubs: Heathmont Tennis Club and H.E. Parker Reserve. Other sporting facilities include a baseball club and a cricket club.

Golfers play at the Heathmont Par 3 Golf Course on Canterbury Road.

There are two Scout Groups: Heathmont and 3rd Heathmont. Both are located in reserves along the Dandenong Creek: 3rd Heathmont in H.E. Parker, and Heathmont in Kathleen Barrow.

Churches
There are also many churches situated in Heathmont:
 Heathmont Baptist Church
 Heathmont Uniting Church Community Living Centre
 Heathmont Presbyterian Church
 Heathmont Christadelphians
 Maroondah Presbyterian Reformed Church

Anglican:
 Djerrnong–Anglican Parish of Heathmont/Ringwood East, located at 203–205 Canterbury Road, Heathmont.

See also
 City of Ringwood – Heathmont was previously within this former local government area.
 Heathmont railway station - located in the centre of the suburb on the Belgrave line
 Maroondah City Council - the municipality in which Heathmont resides

References

External links
 City of Maroondah
 Heathmont Baseball Club
 Heathmont Jets
 Heathmont Hornets
 Heathmont Bowls

Suburbs of Melbourne
Suburbs of the City of Maroondah